The Czechoslovakia women's national field hockey team represented Czechoslovakia in international women's field hockey. It won the silver medal at the 1980 Summer Olympics in Moscow, Soviet Union.

Tournament record

Summer Olympics
1980 –

World Cup
1978 – 9th place

European Championship
1984 – 9th place

Friendship Games
1984 – 4th place

See also
Czechoslovakia men's national field hockey team
Czech Republic women's national field hockey team
Slovakia women's national field hockey team

References

External links
Czechoslovakia women's hockey team at the 1980 Olympics at sports-reference

Field hockey
Former national field hockey teams
National team
European women's national field hockey teams